Siraya may refer to:
 Siraya people
 Siraya language

Language and nationality disambiguation pages